Rockford or Rockfords may refer to:

Places

United States
 Rockford, Illinois, a city, the largest municipality of this name
Rockford, Alabama, a town
 Rockford, Idaho, a census-designated place
 Rockford metropolitan area, Illinois, a United States Census Bureau statistical area
 Rockford, Jackson County, Indiana, an unincorporated community
 Rockford, Wells County, Indiana, an unincorporated community
 Rockford, Iowa, a city
 Rockford, Michigan, a city
 Rockford, Minnesota, a city
 Rockford, Missouri, an unincorporated community
 Rockford, Nebraska, an unincorporated community
 Rockford, North Carolina, an unincorporated community
 Rockford, Ohio, a village
 Rockford, Tuscarawas County, Ohio
 Rockford, Tennessee, a city
 Rockford, Washington, a town
 Rockford Township (disambiguation)

Elsewhere
 Rockford, Hampshire, England, a hamlet
 Rockford, New Zealand, a locality in the Waimakariri District

Arts and entertainment
 Rockford (album), a 2006 album by the American rock band Cheap Trick
 The Rockfords, an American rock band/side project formed in 1999
 The Rockfords (album), the band's only album, released in 2000
 Jim Rockford (television character), protagonist of the television series The Rockford Files
 Joseph "Rocky" Rockford, Jim's father, a supporting character on the show
 Rockford (film), a 1999 film directed by Nagesh Kukunoor
 Rockford (video game), an arcade spin-off of the Boulder Dash video game series

Education
 Rockford University, a private liberal arts college in Rockford, Illinois
 Rockford High School (disambiguation)
 Rockford Public Schools (disambiguation), also school districts

Sports
 Jim Rockford (Canadian football player) (born 1961), former Canadian Football League player
 Rockford Municipal Stadium, a former name of Beyer Stadium, Rockford, Illinois
 Rockford Speedway, Loves Park, Illinois, United States

Other uses
 USS Rockford (PF-48), a World War II frigate
 Rockford (wrestler), a ring name of Canadian retired professional wrestler Todd Fenwick (born 1968)
 A driving maneuver also known as a J-turn, named after the stunt performed often on The Rockford Files

See also
 Little Rockford, an Antarctic exploration base from 1958 to 1965